According to Jewish tradition, the Tomb of Maimonides is in central Tiberias, on the western shore of the Sea of Galilee, Israel. Maimonides died in Fustat, Egypt on 12 December 1204, where it is believed that he was briefly buried before being reinterred in Tiberias.
The Tomb of Maimonides is one of the most important Jewish pilgrimage sites in Israel, and one of Tiberias's most visited tourist attractions. The place of the tomb of Maimonides is also the burial place of Rabbis Yochanan ben Zakai and Isaiah Horowitz.

Legends
Many legends are told about the burial of Maimonides. According to Jewish tradition, his bones were placed for a week in a small shrine where he used to study and to heal strangers. While some believe his bones never left Egypt, others believe that the permanent place of his burial was on the western shore of the Sea of Galilee, where Tiberias is now sited. One legend has it that a band of Bedouins – who were about to attack the funeral cortège as it marched through the desert – "hung their heads in shame" after realizing it was the funeral of the man who had attended themselves and their families for free, and instead formed a protective guard for the procession as it made its way to Israel.

Another legend was told by Joseph ben Isaac Sambari, a Jewish-Egyptian chronicler of the seventeenth century, who lived probably between 1640 and 1703. In one of his books Sambari mentioned an oral anecdote about the people who carried his body to the Sea of Galilee for permanent burial mistakenly leaving one of his toes behind in the Maimonides synagogue, which at that time was called the synagogue of Western (Tunisian) Jews. Later one of the people who carried the body had a dream, in which a wise man of Egypt reminded him about the forgotten toe. The toe was recovered and buried next to the body.

Tiberias

Rabbi Ya'akov Moshe Toledano originally purchased the lands around the tomb in 1920. As a result, the tomb was transferred to Jewish ownership.

At the end of 1955 the Religious Services Minister of Israel began the excavation work at the site of the tomb, and soon many additional graves were discovered around the tomb of Maimonides. The employees of the Department of National Roads Company of Israel continued to work despite the presence of graves.

After a period of time, the work was resumed as well as the protests of the ultra-Orthodox activists which was also resumed. Neturei Karta activists had protesters physically protecting the graves throughout the day in shifts, preventing the workers and archaeologists to approach the graves. Another group of ultra-Orthodox activists from Bnei Brak joined them later as well. The groups of protesters consisted of hundreds of people, and they also held demonstrations in the streets of Tiberias. Neturei Karta also claimed at the time that they are considering turning to the United Nations to intervene in this affair.

Later on, one of the tractors working at the site accidentally hit the nearby grave of Isaiah Horowitz. Even though it happened accidentally, this event created a rage among the protesters, and the tractor driver had to quickly flee from the area for his life. Following this incident and the uproar it initiated, it was eventually decided to suspend the work at Maimonides' tomb site. Representatives of the Religious Services Minister of Israel and the Chief Rabbinate pledged that no excavation work would be done in the site.

Later, a large metal structure was erected over the tomb complex. It symbolizes a crown, indicating the great respect accorded Maimonides in Jewish tradition.

Identification of place of Burial of Maimonides
The earliest source for the claim that Maimonides is buried in Tiberias is Al-Qifti, and this view is corroborated by a wide variety of 13th–15th century chronicles. The earliest source to introduce doubt was Samuel Shullam, who wrote "He was buried in Tiberias, or, as some say, he was buried with the Patriarchs in Hebron." Most modern scholars agree that Maimonides was buried in Tiberias, though  argued that his body never left Egypt.

References

External links 
 The Tomb of Maimonides at goisrael.com

Maimonides
Buildings and structures in Tiberias
Jewish pilgrimage sites
Tombs in Israel
Sea of Galilee